Javier Mauricio Bayk (born 2 February 1994) is an Argentine footballer who plays as a midfielder for Deportivo Morón.

Career

Bayk started his career with Argentine fourth division side Bella Vista (Bahía Blanca).

In 2016, he signed for Bokelj in Montenegro after trialing for Italian second division club Trapani.

Before the 2019 season, Bayk signed for La Serena in Chile after playing for Argentine third division team San Jorge.

Before the 2021 season, he signed for Güemes in the Argentine second division.

The 2021 season, he signed for San Luis de Quillota in the Chilean second division.

References

External links
 
 

Living people
1994 births
Argentine expatriate footballers
Argentine footballers
Association football midfielders
Montenegrin First League players
Primera B de Chile players
Primera Nacional players
Torneo Federal A players
FK Bokelj players
FK Iskra Danilovgrad players
FK Rudar Pljevlja players
San Jorge de Tucumán footballers
Deportes La Serena footballers
Deportes Santa Cruz footballers
San Luis de Quillota footballers
Deportivo Morón footballers
Argentine expatriate sportspeople in Montenegro
Argentine expatriate sportspeople in Chile
Expatriate footballers in Montenegro
Expatriate footballers in Chile